Martin Hohenberger (born 29 January 1977) is an Austrian former ice hockey player. He played the majority of his career in Austria, and was selected by the Montreal Canadiens in the 1995 NHL Entry Draft, though he never played in the NHL. Internationally he played for Austria at several tournaments, including the 1998 Winter Olympics and the 2002 Winter Olympics.

Career statistics

Regular season and playoffs

International

References

External links

1977 births
Living people
Austrian ice hockey left wingers
DEG Metro Stars players
EC VSV players
EHC Black Wings Linz players
Fredericton Canadiens players
Graz 99ers players
Ice hockey players at the 1998 Winter Olympics
Ice hockey players at the 2002 Winter Olympics
Innsbrucker EV players
Lethbridge Hurricanes players
Montreal Canadiens draft picks
New Orleans Brass players
Olympic ice hockey players of Austria
Sportspeople from Villach
Prince George Cougars players
Revier Löwen players
Victoria Cougars (WHL) players
Austrian expatriate ice hockey people
Austrian expatriate sportspeople in Canada
Austrian expatriate sportspeople in the United States